Emílio Henrique Baumgart or Emil Heinrich Baumgart (in German) was a Brazilian engineer.

Background
Baumgart was born on May 25, 1889, in the city of Blumenau, in the state of Santa Catarina, Brazil. His father was the German immigrant Gustav Baumgart and his mother was Mathilde Odebrecht, daughter of the German immigrant and engineer Emil Odebrecht. A typical German-Brazilian of his days, Emílio Henrique Baumgart was bilingual, speaking both German and Portuguese fluently.

Education
Emílio Henrique Baumgart started his studies in his home state but also studied in the city of São Leopoldo in the state of Rio Grande do Sul. Later, he attended the Escola Politécnica do Rio de Janeiro (today's Escola de Engenharia da UFRJ).

Career
While attending the  Escola Politécnica, Baumgart worked as an intern with the Firma L. Riedlinger (an engineering firm located in Rio de Janeiro). Lambert Riedlinger brought the reinforced concrete building technique from Germany at the time. As a result, Baumgart became well known for his innovative projects throughout Brazil and abroad.

Personal
Baumgart married Stela Maria in 1915 with whom he had a son and a daughter (his son died aged 24). He died unexpectedly on his way to work on 9 October 1943.

External links
Odebrecht + Baumgart. Site in Portuguese. Accessed on October 26, 2005.

20th-century Brazilian engineers
Brazilian people of German descent
People from Blumenau
Federal University of Rio de Janeiro alumni
1889 births
1943 deaths